Cindy Resnick (born July 31, 1949) is an American politician who served in the Arizona House of Representatives from the 14th district from 1983 to 1991 and in the Arizona Senate from the 14th district from 1991 to 1995.

References

1949 births
Living people
People from Three Rivers, Michigan
Women state legislators in Arizona
Democratic Party members of the Arizona House of Representatives
Democratic Party Arizona state senators